Symphyotrichum parviceps (formerly Aster parviceps) is a species of flowering plant in the family Asteraceae. It is native to the central United States, and is commonly known as smallhead aster or small white aster. A usually short-lived herbaceous, perennial plant, it may reach  in height. Its flowers have white ray florets and pale yellow then purplish disk florets.

Distribution and habitat
S. parviceps is native to Arkansas, Illinois, Iowa, Kansas, Missouri, and Oklahoma in the United States. It has been introduced to the Transcaucasus.

Conservation
, NatureServe listed S. parviceps as Apparently Secure (G4) globally and Vulnerable (S3) in Illinois and Missouri. The species' global status was last reviewed on 29 April 1997.

Citations

References

parviceps
Flora of the United States
Plants described in 1898
Taxa named by Edward Sandford Burgess